Fine Wine may refer to:
 Fine wine
 Fine Wine (Fine Wine album), a 1976 album by a group of the same name
 Fine Wine (Bill Anderson album), a 1998 album by Bill Anderson
 Fine Wine (film), a 2021 Nigerian romantic comedy film
 The World of Fine Wine, a quarterly publication for wine enthusiasts and collectors
 "Fine Wine", song by Kylie Minogue from the album Disco (2020)